Ronald Leslie McEwin (1 January 1928 – 14 March 2007) was an Australian rules footballer in the Victorian Football League (VFL).

Ron McEwin was a member of the Essendon premiership teams in 1949 and 1950.

In 1953 McEwin moved to Mildura as captain-coach of the South Mildura team and he later took up umpiring in the Sunraysia Football League.

External links

Ron McEwin's profile at Essendon FC

Essendon Football Club players
Essendon Football Club Premiership players
Australian rules footballers from Melbourne
1928 births
2007 deaths
Two-time VFL/AFL Premiership players
People from Richmond, Victoria